ʿAbd Allāh ibn ʿAqīl (Arabic: عبدالله بن عقیل بن أبی طالب) was among Husayn ibn Ali's companions who was martyred at the Battle of Karbala.

Lineage 
Aqil ibn Abi Talib had two children named Abd Allah, Abd Allah al-Akbar (the older) and Abd Allah al-Asghar (the younger). Some sources stated that both of his sons were martyred in the Battle of Karbala. This Abd Allah is Abd Allah Akbar.

Abd Allah married Maymuna the daughter of Ali ibn Abi Talib.

In the Battle of Karbala 
His name is mentioned in Ziyarat Shuhada as Abu Abd Allah ibn Muslim ibn Aqil.

References 

People killed at the Battle of Karbala
600s births
680 deaths

Year of birth uncertain
Husayn ibn Ali

Hussainiya